

The Institute for Nuclear Studies was founded September 1945 as part of the University of Chicago with Samuel King Allison as director. On November 20, 1955, it was renamed The Enrico Fermi Institute for Nuclear Studies. The name was shortened to The Enrico Fermi Institute (EFI) in January 1968.

Physicist Enrico Fermi was heavily involved in the founding years of the institute, and it was at his request that Allison took the position as the first director.  In addition to Fermi and Allison, the initial faculty included Harold C. Urey,  Edward Teller, Joseph E. Mayer, and Maria Goeppert Mayer.

Research activities
Theoretical and experimental particle physics;
Theoretical and experimental astrophysics and cosmology;
General relativity;
Electron microscopy;
Ion microscopy and secondary ion mass spectrometry;
Nonimaging optics and solar energy concentration;
Geochemistry, cosmochemistry and nuclear chemistry.

Notable staff
Herbert L. Anderson, nuclear physicist
James Cronin, Nobel laureate in physics
Enrico Fermi, Nobel laureate in physics
Riazuddin, nuclear physicist
Robert Geroch, general relativist
James Hartle, general relativist
Craig Hogan, astronomer
Faheem Hussain, string theorist
Leo Kadanoff, condensed matter physicist
Edward Kolb, cosmologist
Emil Martinec, string theorist
Joseph E. Mayer, chemist
Maria Goeppert Mayer, Nobel laureate in physics
Yoichiro Nambu, Nobel laureate in physics
Marcel Schein, cosmic ray physicist
John Alexander Simpson, nuclear and cosmic ray physicist
Edward Teller, nuclear physicist, father of the hydrogen bomb
Michael Turner, cosmologist
Harold C. Urey, Nobel laureate in chemistry
Carlos E.M. Wagner, particle phenomenologist
Robert M. Wald, general relativist
Gregor Wentzel, quantum physicist

See also
 Fermilab
Particle physics
James Franck Institute

References

External links
 
Guide to the University of Chicago Institute for Nuclear Studies Cyclotron. Records 1946-1952 at the University of Chicago Special Collections Research Center

Institute
University of Chicago
Nuclear research institutes
Organizations established in 1945
Research institutes in Illinois
Theoretical physics institutes
Physics institutes